Mount Pleasant, Queensland may refer to:
 Mount Pleasant, Queensland (Moreton Bay Region), a mountain and locality in the Moreton Bay Region, part of the D'Aguilar Range
 Mount Pleasant, Queensland (Mackay Region), a mountain and suburb of Mackay in the Mackay Region
 a number of other mountains called Mount Pleasant in other parts of Queensland